Tarbagataysky District (Tarbagatain aimag) is an administrative and municipal district (raion), one of the twenty-one in the Republic of Buryatia, Russia. It is located in the center of the republic. Its administrative center is the rural locality (a selo) of Tarbagatay. As of the 2010 Census, the total population of the district was 16,476, with the population of Tarbagatay accounting for 26.2% of that number.

Administrative and municipal status
Within the framework of administrative divisions, Tarbagataysky District is one of the twenty-one in the Republic of Buryatia. The district is divided into ten selsoviets, which comprise twenty-three rural localities. As a municipal division, the district is incorporated as Tarbagataysky Municipal District. Its ten selsoviets are incorporated as ten rural settlements within the municipal district. The selo of Tarbagatay serves as the administrative center of both the administrative and municipal district.

References

Notes

Sources

Districts of Buryatia
 
